Bernard Widrow (born December 24, 1929) is a U.S. professor of electrical engineering at Stanford University.  He is the co-inventor of the Widrow–Hoff least mean squares filter (LMS) adaptive algorithm with his then doctoral student Ted Hoff.  The LMS algorithm led to the ADALINE and MADALINE artificial neural networks and to the backpropagation technique. He made other fundamental contributions to the development of  signal processing in the fields of geophysics, adaptive antennas, and adaptive filtering.

Publications
1965 "A critical comparison of two kinds of adaptive classification networks", K. Steinbuch and B. Widrow, IEEE Transactions on Electronic Computers, pp. 737–740.
1985 B. Widrow and S. D. Stearns. Adaptive Signal Processing. New Jersey: Prentice-Hall, Inc., 1985.
1994 B. Widrow and E. Walach. Adaptive Inverse Control. New Jersey: Prentice-Hall, Inc., 1994.
2008 B. Widrow and I. Kollar.  Quantization Noise: Roundoff Error in Digital Computation, Signal Processing, Control, and Communications.  Cambridge University Press, 2008.

Honors
 Elected Fellow IEEE, 1976
 Elected Fellow AAAS, 1980
 IEEE Centennial Medal, 1984
 IEEE Alexander Graham Bell Medal, 1986
 IEEE Neural Networks Pioneer Medal, 1991
 Inducted into the National Academy of Engineering, 1995
 IEEE Signal Processing Society Award, 1999
 IEEE Millennium Medal, 2000
 Benjamin Franklin Medal, 2001
  International Neural Network Society (INNIS) Board member 2004
He was one of the Board of Governors of the International Neural Network Society (INNIS) in 2003.

References

1929 births
Artificial intelligence researchers
IEEE Centennial Medal laureates
Living people
Members of the United States National Academy of Engineering
Place of birth missing (living people)
Stanford University faculty